Jan Kuźma (born 1 June 2003) is a Polish professional footballer who plays as a midfielder for Górnik Polkowice, on loan from ŁKS Łódź.

Career statistics

Club

References

2003 births
Living people
Sportspeople from Nowy Sącz
Polish footballers
Poland youth international footballers
Association football midfielders
Sandecja Nowy Sącz players
ŁKS Łódź players
Górnik Polkowice players
I liga players
II liga players
III liga players